Dion Bates (born 16 July 1981 in Invercargill, New Zealand) is a New Zealand rugby union player who plays as a flanker for the Southland Stags in the Air New Zealand Cup.

He made 31 appearances over the course of his career, scoring one try.

References

External links 
 Itsrugby Profile
 Southland Player Profile

1981 births
People educated at Verdon College
People educated at Southland Boys' High School
Living people
New Zealand rugby union players
Otago rugby union players
Rugby union flankers
Southland rugby union players
Rugby union players from Invercargill